Río Bueno is a city and commune in southern Chile administered by the  Municipality of Río Bueno. It is located in Ranco Province in Los Ríos Region. Río Bueno takes its name from the Bueno River which flows through the city and commune.
Rio Bueno is one of the better rivers to fish.

Demographics
Of these, 15,054 (46.1%) lived in urban areas and 17,573 (53.9%) in rural areas. Between the 1992 and 2002 censuses, the population fell by 1.1% (354 persons).

Administration
As a commune, Río Bueno is a third-level administrative division of Chile administered by a municipal council, headed by an alcalde who is directly elected every four years. The 2008-2012 alcalde is Luis Reyes Alvarez (UDI).

Within the electoral divisions of Chile, Río Bueno is represented in the Chamber of Deputies by Enrique Jaramillo (PDC) and Gastón Von Mühlenbrock (UDI) as part of the 54th electoral district, together with Panguipulli, Los Lagos, Futrono, Lago Ranco, La Unión and Paillaco.

References

External links
  Municipality of Río Bueno

Colonial fortifications in Chile
Populated places in Ranco Province
Communes of Chile
Populated places established in 1778
1778 establishments in the Spanish Empire
1778 establishments in South America